Tinmel (Berber: Tin Mel or Tin Mal) is a small mountain village in the High Atlas 100 km from Marrakesh, Morocco. Tinmel was the cradle of the Berber Almohad empire, from where the Almohads started their military campaigns against the Almoravids in the early 12th century.

History 
With the seizure of Marrakesh in 1147, Tin Mal became the spiritual capital and the artistic centre of the Almohad Caliphate. The village is home to the tombs of the Almohad rulers. In Tin Mal the Almohad dirham, symbol of its economic prosperity, was struck.

Tin Mal Mosque

The Tin Mal Mosque is a mosque located in the High Atlas mountains of North Africa. It was built in 1156 to commemorate the founder of the Almohad dynasty, Mohamed Ibn Tumart. The edifice is one of the two mosques in Morocco open to non-Muslims, the other being the Hassan II Mosque in Casablanca. The prototype for the Tin Mal mosque was the Great Mosque of Taza, also built by Abd al-Mu'min. The Koutoubia in Marrakech was in its turn modelled on it.

World Heritage Status 
The Tin Mal mosque was added to the UNESCO World Heritage Tentative List on 1 July 1995 in the Cultural category.

See also
Koutoubia
Great Mosque of Taza

References

Sources

External links

MWNF 
Front of the mosque 

Almohad Caliphate
Berber populated places
Berber words and phrases
Mountain villages in Morocco
Populated places in Al Haouz Province
Former capitals of Morocco